The 2010–11 season was Deportivo de La Coruña's 40th' season in La Liga, the top division of Spanish football.

The season covered the period of 1 July 2010 to 30 June 2011.

Players

Squad information

Summer transfers

In

Loan in

Out

Loan out

Loan return 
Italics for players returning to the club but left it during pre-season

Loan end

Pre-season
The club played a series of friendlies preparing for the new season. Deportivo de La Coruña goals are first.

Competitions

La Liga

League table

Positions by round

Matches
Kickoff times are in ET.

Copa del Rey

Round of 32

Club

Coaching staff

See also
2010–11 Copa del Rey
2010–11 La Liga

External links 
  
Unofficial Spanish fansite 
Another unofficial Spanish fansite 
Official international website
Official international forum
Polish site 
Unofficial arabic fansite
Unofficial Turkey Fan
Unofficial Russian Fan

Deportivo de La Coruna
Deportivo de La Coruña seasons